Munslow is a civil parish in Shropshire, England.  It contains 40 listed buildings that are recorded in the National Heritage List for England.  Of these, one is listed at Grade I, the highest of the three grades, five are at Grade II*, the middle grade, and the others are at Grade II, the lowest grade.  The parish contains villages and smaller settlements. including Aston Munslow, Beambridge, Broadstone, Hungerford, and Munslow, and the surrounding countryside.   Most of the listed buildings are in the settlements, many of which are houses, cottages, farmhouses and farm buildings, the earliest of which are timber framed.  The largest building is a country house, which is listed, together with associated structures and farm buildings, and there is also a mansion and a former manor house.  The other listed buildings include a church with a 12th-century origin, an isolated chapel, a public house, a former mill house and mill buildings, a former smithy, and a war memorial.


Key

Buildings

References

Citations

Sources

Lists of buildings and structures in Shropshire